Object identity may refer to:
 Identity (object-oriented programming)
 Equality (objects)